François Roche (born 1961) is a French architect. Roche is the co-founder and director of R&Sie(n) Architects and the research architectural firm, New Territories/M4.

Early life and education

François Roche was born in 1961 in Paris, France. Roche sought to study science and math in college, but, was unable to enroll in a specific class he wanted to attend and changed his degree to architecture. His interest in the sciences would go on to influence his architectural work. He spent time in an Algerian desert during his time in college, deciding if he wanted to finish his degree in architecture. In 1987, he graduated from the École nationale supérieure d'architecture de Versailles.

Career

Roche founded his first studio in Paris in 1989. He expanded to incorporate Stephanie Lavaux as a partner, naming the studio R&Sie(n) The "R" in the name is for Roche, the "S" is for Stephanie, and is pronounced similarly to the word "heresy" in French. The studio specializes in architectural "investigations" and "scenarios" with the goal of connecting the relationship between humans and buildings. Roche would go on to create New Territories/M4, which houses R&Sie, along with other installation, architectural, and digital design projects, with partner Camille Lacadée. 

Since the 1990s, Roche has been represented by an androgynous, digitally created avatar named s/he. Roche describes s/he as "a kind of doppelgänger, a Siamese twin, the mask of Mishima, an avatar of Vishnu. Androgynous in appearance and with a queer attitude, s/he has enabled me for twenty-five years to maintain a singular voice, coming from nowhere, emerging from territories that abandoned the posture of authority, of discourse, and of academia." 

In 2004, R&Sie(n) created DustyRelief for the Museum of Contemporary Art, Bangkok, Thailand. The piece was designed to absorb the city smog, which would then cause the structure to grow. The piece was inspired by Man Ray's Dust Breeding. The project was canceled due to a coup d'état.  

While speaking in at an event in London in 2010, Roche shared that he would be "happy" if somebody went into one of his buildings or designs, got lost, and died. That same year, Roche ended his professional relationship with Lavaux and began working with Camille Lacadée. In 2011, the avatar used to represent the R&Sie(n) committed "suicide" only to re-emerge in 2017. Around 2013, Roche opened a studio in the Talat Noi neighborhood of Bangkok. Before relocating from Paris to Bangkok, Roche transformed his Paris house in a project called I'm Lost in Paris. The project involved cultivating bacteria which turned into vegetation covering the house. 

Roche and Lacadée launched a Kickstarter to raise funds to an "experimental hybrid building" called MMYST. The project was to be built by robots in Thailand. In May 2015, Roche, Lacadée, and Pierre Huyghe to create "What Could Happen," an "experimental expedition" in the Swiss Alps. In October 2015, he lectured with Lacadée at the University of Michigan's Taubman College. That same month, Roche and Lacadée exhibited #mythomaniaS at the Chicago Architecture Biennial. The exhibit included videos of "architectural scenarios" around the world. Roche's professional partnership with Lacadée ended in 2015.

In 2016, Frac Centre-Val de Loire held a retrospective of Roche's work with New Territories/M4.

Roche's work has been exhibited at Mori Art Museum, Columbia University, the Pompidou Center, the Museum of Modern Art, the Massachusetts Institute of Technology, Yale University and other museums and galleries. Roche has exhibited in the Venice Biennale multiple times,  including in 2004's Metamorph International Architecture Exposition; the 2008 International Architecture Exposition in which R&Sie exhibited their "bi[r]o-bo[o]ts"; the 2014 "Time Space Existence: Made in Europe" biennale; and 2018 at the Bembo Pavilion and the Lithuanian Pavilion. Roche has also participated as a panelist at the 2012 United States pavilion. His 2010 installation, Building Which Never Dies, was confiscated by Italian police for containing uranium. The incident caused an entire section of the Biennale to be closed for an entire day.

Themes and concepts in Roche's work

Roche's works often represent the divergence of science, architecture, philosophy, science fiction genetics, art, identity, and biopolitics. However, through the avatar, Roche explores philosophical concepts of the LGBTQI community, communications, and philosophy. In describing his beliefs and work, Roche often cites fiction and non-fiction, ranging from Jacques Lacan to Noam Chomsky to Paul B. Preciado. Roche describes s/he and New Territories as “tool to knot and unknot realities" in the spirit of Michel Foucault.

The Frac Centre-Val de Loire calls Roche's early work as veering "towards hybridization and “hyperlocalism”, aimed at distorting reality and bringing out its most significant unusualness." In 1996, Roche started using digital processes to create his work. Roche's later works also incorporate robotics complemented by writing and lectures.

Reception
Roche has been called an "elusive" artist by The New York Times, a "provocateur" by the Bangkok Post, and "always provocative" by The Architect's Newspaper. The New York Times describes Roche's work as "not buildings exactly, but scientific experiments."

Monographs
2018 / #digitaldisobediences_s/he would rather do Fiction Maker (Frac-Centre)  
2015 / mythomaniaS.
2014 / Heretical-Machinism.
2011 / Architecture des Humeurs. Catalogue on research-exhibition. PDF 2mo
2010 / New-Territories-R&Sie(n). 
2010 / BioReboot.
2007 / Fiction Scripts. 
2006 / Spoiled Climate. 
2005 / I,ve heard About. 
2004 / Corrupted Biotopes.
2003 / T(e)en Years After.
2000 / Mutation @morphes.
1994 / The Shadow of Chameleon.
All monographies/ texts / article are public and free downloadable

Academia
Roche and S/he were involved in Guest Professor position among other places and chronologically at Bartlett-UCL-London 2000, at Upenn-Philadelphia 2006 and 2015-016, at GSAPP-Columbia-NYc 2006-2017, at USC-Los Angeles 2009-11, at RMIT-Melbourne 2012-2017, and few years at IKA (2017) and Angewante-Vienna (2009), AFAA-Bratislava (2018). He started in 2023 a new position at KHM-Koln.

Notable exhibitions
1993: Action, Solo exhibition Institut Francais d'Architecture
1999-2000: @namorphous changes, Columbia University (New York), UCLA (Los Angeles)
1996: le monolythe fracture, Venice Architecture Biennale, French Pavillon
2000: aqua alta 1.0/2.0, Venice Architecture Biennale, International and French Pavillon
2001: In any way, it's already happened, ICA, London 
2003: Asphalt Spot, Echigo-Tsumari Art Triennial, Niigata Prefecture, Japan
2004: metamorph, Venice Architecture Biennale, International Pavillon
2004: Frac Collection, Mori Art Museum, Tokyo 
2004: L’exposition Architectures non standard, Centre Pompidou, Paris, France
2005: "I’ve heard about (Modèles de sécrétion)", as New Territories, Musée d'Art Moderne de Paris, Paris, France
2006: Frac Centre-Val de Loire, Orléans, France
2006: terra incognita, Tate Modern, London, 2006, with Pierre Huyghe
2008: Venice Architecture Biennale, International Italian Pavillon 
2009: radical nature, Barbican, London, [
2009: Lost in Paris, Musée du Quai Branly – Jacques Chirac, Paris, France
2010:Venice Architecture Biennale, International Pavillon (@isotropic uranium installation)
2009: green building, Louisiana (Denmark, 2009), 
2010: An Architecture in Moods, solo exhibition, Mori Art Museum, Tokyo, Japan
2010: L’architecture des humeurs, solo exhibition, Le Laboratoire, Paris, France
2015: #mythomaniaS, Chicago Architecture Biennial, Chicago, Illinois
2016: S/he would rather do Fiction maker, retrospective, Frac Centre-Val de Loire, Orléans, France
2016: Are we human, Istanbul Biennale
2019: The Arts and the Future, Mori Tower, Tokyo, Japan, 'an Architecture of MOODs'
2020: Escape Routes, FortuneShel(tell)er, Biennale Bangkok,      
2021: Ecologies and Politics of the Living, Vienna Biennale, Vienna, Austria
2022: Rivus, Biennale Sydney,

Notable collections
2002: Scrambled Flat 2.0, Waterflux, Evolène, Suisse, with R&Sie, Centre Pompidou, Paris, France
2003: "Mosquito Bottleneck Project, Trinidad", with R&Sie, SFMOMA, San Francisco, California
2003: "R&Sie(n), Water Flux (unbuilt) : Rendering of the structure", Canadian Centre for Architecture, Montreal
2005: "I’ve heard about (Modèles de sécrétion)", selected works, as New Territories, Mudam, Luxembourg City, Luxembourg
2007: "Heshotmedown, Demilitarized Zone, Korea", with R&Sie, SFMOMA, San Francisco, California
2018: mind [e] scape, as New Territories, Echigo-Tsumari Art Field, Niigata Prefecture, Japan

Further reading
Works about François Roche
Contati, Anna. “Genetic in-Formation Metaphor: Eduardo Arroyo vs François Roche.” Villardjournal 01.018 Investigate, edited by Giovanni Corbellini, Quodlibet, 2018, pp. 23–30.
Di Raimo, Antonino. Francois Roche Heretical Machinism and Living Architecture of New Territories.com. 2014. ISBN 1291883800
Saunders, Zack. “New Solidarities: #Digitaldisobediences.” Log, no. 44, 2018, pp. 55–62. 
Sprecher, Aaron and François LeBlanc. “Dissipative Architecture: The Informed Nature of Atopia.” Journal of Architectural Education (1984-), vol. 67, no. 1, 2013, pp. 27–30.

Works by François Roche
Roche, François, as editor, Log, no. 25, 2012
Roche, François. “' Alchimis (t/r/Ick)—Machines.” Log, no. 22, 2011, pp. 158–168.
Roche, François & Lacadée, Camille. "MythomaniaS: Crime Scenes & Psycho Case Studies". Brooklyn: punctum books (2015).
Roche, François & Lacadée, Camille. (2016). "Parrhesia-stases (The Preamble)". Architectural Design. 86. 66-71. 10.1002/ad.2112.

Personal life
Roche lives in Bangkok. Roche goes to great lengths to avoid having his photograph published, a concept he has compared to Daft Punk or Margiela.

References

External links

"François Roche gave free accesses to three of his books" from World Architecture
"Conversation: Roche, Ellis & Manaugh" from Icon
Interview with François Roche from the Australian Design Review

1961 births
21st-century French architects
20th-century French architects
Architects from Paris
French expatriates in Thailand
Living people